Blairmount is a suburb of Sydney, in the state of New South Wales, Australia 58 kilometres south-west of the Sydney central business district, in the local government area of the City of Campbelltown. It is part of the Macarthur region. Its main road is Clydesdale Drive and its other streets are named after horse breeds.

History
The history of the region begins over 40,000 years ago and is contained in the continuing culture of the Tharawal people. The land still contains reminders of their past lives in rock engravings, cave paintings, axe grinding grooves and shell middens.

British settlers began moving into the area in the early 19th century, establishing farms and orchards on the fertile soil. In 1928, a Frank Young brought the property which was now known as Blairmount and turned it into a horse stud specialising in Clydesdale horses. The suburb began to be redeveloped into housing in the 1980s and a school was opened in 1983.

Demographics
According to the 2016 census, there were 482 residents in Blairmount. In Blairmount, 62.8% of people were born in Australia. The most common other countries of birth were England 3.7%, Samoa 2.7%, New Zealand 2.5%, Fiji 2.3% and Lebanon 2.3%. 64.5% of people only spoke English at home. Other languages spoken at home included Samoan 5.0%, Arabic 4.4%, Hindi 2.9%, Spanish 2.3% and Italian 1.7%. The most common responses for religion in Blairmount were Catholic 39.5%, Anglican 16.0%, No Religion 6.9%, Islam 5.6% and Presbyterian and Reformed 3.7%.

Schools

 Blairmount Public School

References

Towns in the Macarthur (New South Wales)
Suburbs of Sydney
Hume Highway
City of Campbelltown (New South Wales)